The Gabha Narerkathi massacre was a premediated massacre of Bengali Hindus in Gabha Narerkathi in Barisal, Bangladesh on 2 May 1971 by the Pakistan Army in collaboration with the Razakars during the Bangladesh Liberation War. According to sources, 95-100 Bengali Hindus were killed by the Pakistan Army and the Razakars.

Events 
The soldiers of the Pakistan Army, accompanied by the razakars of surrounding villages, came to Gabha Narerkathi on the morning of 2 May. They then ordered all the Hindus of the village to come out of their homes for a "peace committee" meeting. They were captured by the razakars and taken to the bank of a nearby canal, where they were shot and killed. Some of them who tried to escape by jumping into the water got drowned and carried away by the fast water stream.

Aftermath 
After the end of the war, the site of the massacre was marked by the local people, but till now neither a memorial has been constructed for the fallen, nor the victims' names have been tabulated.

References 

1971 Bangladesh genocide
Massacres of Bengali Hindus in East Pakistan
1971 in Bangladesh
Massacres in 1971
Massacres committed by Pakistan in East Pakistan
May 1971 events in Asia